Fanshen station is an underground metro station on Line 5 of the Shenzhen Metro. It opened on 22 June 2011.

Station layout

Exits

References

External links
 Shenzhen Metro Fanshen Station (Chinese)
 Shenzhen Metro Fanshen Station (English)

Shenzhen Metro stations
Railway stations in Guangdong
Bao'an District
Railway stations in China opened in 2011